Kenton Edward Cool (born 30 July 1973) is an English mountaineer and mountain guide. He is one of Britain's leading alpine and high altitude climbers and has reached the summit of Mount Everest sixteen times, including leading Sir Ranulph Fiennes' 2008 and 2009 Expeditions.

He has completed over 20 notable expeditions in the Greater Ranges and, in 2013, became the first person to climb Nuptse, Everest and Lhotse in a single push without returning to base camp.

Biography

Cool was born in Slough, Buckinghamshire (now Berkshire) in 1973. His family surname was originally Kuhle and was changed during the Second World War by his half-German grandfather. His father was a photographer and his mother a florist, and the family home was near to Uxbridge, in Middlesex. He was schooled at John Hampden Grammar School in High Wycombe, and later obtained a place at the University of Leeds. Cool graduated from the University of Leeds in 1994 after studying BSc Geological Sciences.

Cool was first introduced to mountaineering at Scouts. An obsession with rock climbing developed at Leeds University and, on graduating, he moved to Sheffield to pursue this further.

In 1996, he suffered a fall from a rock face near Llanberis Pass in north Wales with calcaneal fractures of both heel bones; he was told by a specialist that "the chances are you will walk with a stick for the rest of your life." A year of surgery and therapy saw him determined to regain his climbing form, and he joined the British Association of Mountain Guides scheme.

In his twenties he did not want to be a guide so worked at "industrial roped access" on tall buildings (four months on the Millennium Dome). He then guided for Jagged Globe, and then co-founded 'Adventure Base' which is now an established worldwide adventure company.  In 2004 when he first met Ranulph Fiennes he had not completed his guiding qualifications for the Alps, although he had been guiding in Nepal and Everest, the UK and Alaska for years.

Cool married in 2008 and now lives in the village of Bibury in Gloucestershire in the UK. A leading Alpine climber, he operates in the Alps and Greater Ranges of the Himalayas as a fully qualified IFMGA (UIAGM) Guide and Expedition Leader.

Regarding the danger of mountaineering and the many friends he has lost in the sport, he has said: "It's completely unstylish to get stuffed in the mountains... I want to die with my feet up in front of the fire drinking a glass of red wine aged about 95."

In 2003, Cool was nominated alongside climbing partners for the Piolet d'Or award for a route on Annapurna III. In 2012 he made good on an 88-year-old Olympic pledge by taking one of the 1924 Olympic Gold Medals awarded to the 1922 British Everest Expedition (awarded for "Outstanding feats of human endeavour") to the summit of Everest. This prompted Lord Coe to personally thank Cool and his team for helping "kick start the 2012 Olympic Games".

Cool was made an honorary Doctor of Laws by Leeds University in July 2018.

Expedition career
Cool is considered one of the UK's top mountain and ski expedition leaders, having made several ascents of hard routes with clients, including the first British guided ascent of the famous North Face of the Eiger in 2007 with polar explorer Sir Ranulph Fiennes, then in his sixties, who was initially afraid of heights.

In May 2008, Cool and Fiennes attempted to summit Mount Everest but Fiennes turned back 300m from the top. In 2009, Cool returned to Everest and successfully led Fiennes to the top, making Cool the most successful British Expedition Leader on the mountain.

In May 2013 Cool along with climbing partner Dorje Gylgen attained the Everest Triple Crown. In the space of just seven days and without returning to Base Camp, he climbed the three mountains that make up the Everest Horseshoe – Nuptse (7,864 metres), Everest (8,850 metres) and Lhotse (8,516 metres). This was a feat many thought to be impossible, due to the amount of time spent at high altitude and the effect this has on the human body.

As an Expedition Leader, Cool has completed over 20 successful expeditions in the Greater Ranges.  On Everest he holds the highest success rate of any mountain guide.  He has personally reached the summit of Everest sixteen times; in May 2007 he reached summits twice in one week.

In October 2006 he was the first British person to complete a ski descent of an 8,000-metre peak, on Cho Oyu in Nepal, the sixth highest mountain in the world. In the autumn of 2010 Cool made the third-ever ski descent of Manaslu in Nepal, the world's eighth highest mountain. In doing so become one of only a few people worldwide to ski multiple 8000 metre peaks.

In January 2015, Cool reached the summit of Everest for an eleventh time. At the top, he held a flag for the Principality of Sealand at the top to symbolize his support for the micronation.

On 12 May 2016 Kenton, at 42, was joined by two Sherpas and another Briton, Robert Lucas, on the summit of the world's highest peak. The Britons were also the first foreign climbers to reach the 8,850 metre (29,035 ft) peak in two years, after a group of Sherpa guides fixing ropes got to the top on Wednesday 11 May. On 15 May 2022 Cool successfully completed his record-breaking 16th summit of Mount Everest, the most number of climbs by any non-Sherpa. Cool was wearing a hand painted protective lid by British contemporary artist Teddy McDonald.

Major climbing routes

Television work
As part of the Eiger expedition in 2007, ITN set up a simulcast at the foot of the mountain, allowing Cool, Fiennes and Parnell to broadcast live from the mountain face and straight into the ITN News studio. Their summit attempt was broadcast on each live news section for five days.  A further one-hour documentary of the successful climb was aired on BBC Four and The Discovery Channel.

As part of his 2007 Everest expedition, Cool took part in filming for the five-part BBC Television documentary Everest ER.  As well as providing extensive interview material for the documentary, Cool was also given specialist high-altitude camera equipment to capture footage high on the mountain, including summit footage.  Everest ER followed Cool's expedition as it unfolded, which included his double summit in one week.  The programme was aired over five weeks on BBC1.

Charitable activity
In March 2007, Cool was part of a three-man team (including Sir Ranulph Fiennes and Ian Parnell) to raise funds for the Marie Curie Eiger Challenge Appeal.  A successful summit of the North Face of the Eiger raised £1.8 million for the Marie Curie Cancer Care charity. In May 2009, Cool and Sir Ranulph Fiennes raised a further £2.6 million for the Marie Curie charity as part of the Everest Challenge Appeal.  Cool summitted with the Marie Curie flag.

Annually, Cool provides a series of speaking events for the Royal Geographical Society and various outdoor clothing manufacturers and retailers as well as keynote speeches at corporate conferences.  He has also been invited to sit on specialist panels.  At these events, he heavily supports and promotes Porters Progress, a foundation set up to support the mountain portering community in Nepal.  Porters Progress is now part of the dZi Foundation.

Personal life
In 2008 Cool married Jazz Black, whom he had met in Chamonix, France. They were married in Fairford, Gloucestershire and currently live in Bibury, also in Gloucestershire. They have two children.

Everest summits
 1st in 2004
 2nd in 2005
 3rd in 2006
 4th on 17 May 2007
 5th on 24 May 2007
 6th in 2008
 7th by 2009
 8th in 2010
 9th in 2011
 10th in 2012
 11th in 2013
 12th in 2016
 13th in 2018
 14th in 2019
 15th in 2021
 16th in 2022

See also
 
 List of Mount Everest summiters by number of times to the summit

References

External links
 Official/Twitter
 Official/Facebook fanpage
 Official/personal website
 Mount Everest Kenton Cool Interview

1973 births
Living people
People from Slough
People from Cotswold District
British people of English descent
British people of German descent
People educated at John Hampden Grammar School
Alumni of the University of Leeds
British summiters of Mount Everest
English mountain climbers